Ernest Lloyd Sommerlad (12 April 1919 – 17 April 2014) was an Australian politician.

He was born at Tenterfield to Ernest Christian Sommerlad, also a politician. He attended Sydney Grammar School and then the University of Sydney, where he received a Bachelor of Arts (1940) and a Bachelor of Economics (1946). During World War II he was an instructor of the Light Anti Aircraft School in Dutch New Guinea, holding the rank of captain. On 6 February 1943 he married Mavis Dorothy Patterson, with whom he had three children. On his return he was secretary of the New South Wales Country Press Association, and directed a number of commercial broadcasting companies. From 1955 to 1967 he was a Country Party member of the New South Wales Legislative Council. He died in Sydney in 2014.

References

1919 births
2014 deaths
National Party of Australia members of the Parliament of New South Wales
Members of the New South Wales Legislative Council